Akal Wood Fossil Park is a National Geological Monument of India located in Jaisalmer district, Rajasthan. It is also a Biodiversity Heritage Site.

It is 21 hectares in extent and is located in Akal village, 17–18 km from Jaisalmer city, and 1 km off the Jaisalmer-Barmer road, on a stretch of about 10 km2 of bare hillside. The terrain is barren and rocky.

The park lies in Jaisalmer's fossil belt, a region noted to have the potential for geological parks. Fossils and footprints of pterosaurs have been found in the nearby Thaiyat area.

The park contains fossils of Pterophyllum, Ptilophyllum, Equisetites species and dicotyledonous wood and gastropod shells of the Early Jurassic period. There are about a dozen fossilised wood logs lying horizontally oriented in random directions, the largest of which is 13.4 m in length and 0.9 m in width. There are a total of 25 petrified tree trunks. The fossils date back 180 million years.

The Geological Survey of India (GSI) declared the site a National Geological Monument in 1972. The park was maintained by GSI till 1985, when maintenance was handed over to the Forest Department of Government of Rajasthan. Now, the park is maintained by the authorities of the Desert National Park. The exposed tree trunks have been protected by iron grill cages with tin sheet roofing.

Geology

The fossils are considered to be of non-flowering trees such as Chir, Deodar and Redwood, as only non-flowering plants (gymnosperms) existed during the geological time when the fossilization took place.

The petrified wood is indicative of lush forests in a tropical warm and humid climate thriving 180 million years ago. Existence of fossils of gastropod shells also suggest that the region was a sea once upon a time. The claim is furthered by the fossils of stems of gymnosperms and fluviatile sediments and deposits. The wood fossils have given evidence that the area has been under the sea on four occasions. However, the host rocks of the wood fossils have been considered continental (non-marine).

After the tree trunks were buried and petrified, geological activities are supposed to have occurred causing the shifting and upheaval of the basin, bringing the fossils to the surface. In addition to the exposed ones, there are more wood fossils lying beneath the surface. Evidence of fruits have also been found.

Visiting
The park is open to visitors throughout the week from 9 am to 6 pm. A nominal entrance fee is charged. There is a small museum near the entrance which showcases photographs of fossils along with brief descriptions.

In 2017, the government of Rajasthan earmarked Rs 10.9 crore to turn the park into an international geographical heritage site, with Rs 5 crore proposed for modernising the park. Apart from tourism, there is also a focus on attracting researchers.

See also
Desert National Park
National Fossil Wood Park, Tiruvakkarai
National Fossil Wood Park, Sathanur

References

National Geological Monuments in India
Fossil parks in India
Mesozoic paleontological sites of Asia
Tourist attractions in Jaisalmer district
Biodiversity Heritage Sites of India